Donald John Ward (born 30 August 1934) is a former cricketer who played first-class cricket for Glamorgan in the County Championship between 1954 and 1962.

An all-rounder born in Trealaw, Tonypandy, but brought up in London, Don Ward bowled right-arm off-spin that took 187 wickets and also contributed 2,496 lower-order runs including six half-centuries. Described as "a very brave and attractive strokemaker" as well as "a good off-spinner", Ward was also a skilled fielder both close to the wicket and in the outfield. He was one of the shortest players in county cricket, at around five feet three inches tall.

His career best with the bat was 86, against Somerset in 1956. With the ball he took his career-best 7 for 60 against Lancashire in 1962, when he bowled Glamorgan to a 12-run victory in the second-last match of his career. He also served in the British Armed Forces, playing for British Army and Royal Artillery teams in 1953.

After leaving Glamorgan at the end of the 1962 season he worked for a transport company in South Wales.

References

External links
 
 

1934 births
Living people
People from Tonypandy
Sportspeople from Rhondda Cynon Taf
Welsh cricketers
Glamorgan cricketers